The First Eagle is the thirteenth crime fiction novel in the Joe Leaphorn / Jim Chee Navajo Tribal Police series by Tony Hillerman, first published in 1998.

Acting Lieutenant Jim Chee finds one of his officers nearly dead, with the perpetrator standing next to him in Yells Back Butte. Retired Lt. Joe Leaphorn searches for a missing Health Department vector control specialist, whose job involves tracing the fleas that carry the Black Plague, and the two cases intertwine before all is resolved.

Plot summary
Anderson Nez dies in the hospital of bubonic plague in a virulent new form. Dr Woody brought him in, and is now demanding details on everything that happened as Nez died in Northern Arizona Medical Center. The infected flea bit Nez the day before with a new strain of plague, at the end of June.

At Yells Back Butte near Black Mesa, Acting Lieutenant Jim Chee finds Officer Kinsman nearly dead, bashed in the head. Robert Jano, a Hopi man, stands close by, with blood on him, and an eagle in a cage. Chee arrests Jano for murdering the police officer. Jano protests his innocence. Kinsman dies in the hospital. Jano is assigned an attorney from the Department of Justice, as the charge carries the death penalty. Attorney Janet Pete is back in Phoenix; she is given his case. She believes he is innocent. Mrs. Vanders hires Joe Leaphorn to find her niece, Catherine Pollard. She has not returned from her work as a vector control specialist, a flea catcher, nor left any word of her plans, since early July. Mrs. Vanders thinks graduate student Victor Hammer might be the problem.

Leaphorn receives Pollard's field work notes, which Louisa Bourebonette reads. Pollard's job is to track down the source of the fleas with bubonic plague, and then to destroy them or the “reservoir” of small rodents that harbor those fleas. She is still pursuing the source for Nez's infection, and realizes someone has lied to her. Leaphorn realizes that Pollard was last seen on the same day that the officer was attacked, July 8. Chee is firm that Jano is guilty. Cowboy Dashee, a good friend of Chee, thinks Chee is wrong. Dashee talks to Leaphorn with an alternate theory of the case, that Pollard is the killer, perhaps in self-defense, as Dashee learned she was there that same day. Leaphorn presents the idea to Chee. Chee works on finding Pollard's black jeep. First evidence is a boy trying to sell the radio from that vehicle. Chee and Officer Manuelito visit the boy. Manuelito tells him of the reward from Mrs. Vander for finding the vehicle, and the boy leads them to the jeep. Pollard is not in it, but her field gear is, except for her Positive Air Purifying Respirator (PAPR) suit. The spacesuit-like garment is used to keep her safe from airborne infections or toxins in the field. Chee listens to Jano's story of what happened before Chee arrived on the scene, learning about the first eagle that Jano tried to catch, but let go, because it was not fit for the religious ceremony. That eagle scratched him, and that is why the eagle he put in the cage shows no blood on it. Chee visits his grand uncle Hosteen Frank Sam Nakai for advice. Chee gets the advice on catching the first eagle and learns that his uncle is dying from lung cancer. Chee proceeds to Jano's first hunting blind and catches the first eagle. He calls the FBI agent in charge to collect the eagle in support of Jano. The agent refuses, so Chee begins recording the call. He tells Janet Pete he has the eagle and of the call, and that he taped it.

Chee and Leaphorn meet Old Lady Notah who tells them all the people present at Yells Back Butte on July 8, not by name but by description, including one in the PAPR garment. Krause tells them that only one shovel is usual in Pollard's jeep, and two were found. At the death hogan, they find Pollard buried in her PAPR garment. They reach Dr. Woody's travelling lab, to find him very ill and irritable. He confesses to both murders as an unimportant detail. He wants his research passed on to a colleague. He killed Pollard because she was about to kill the prairie dog colony infected with the new strain of bubonic plague, and killed Kinsman because he saw Woody burying Pollard. Chee and Leaphorn drive Woody to meet an ambulance. Chee calls the FBI to report Woody's confession, to remove the charge from Jano. Leaphorn asks if Chee would accept the permanent Lieutenant position; he says no. Probably Chee made that choice before he recorded that phone conversation. Chee thanks Leaphorn for his help and Leaphorn enjoys working with Chee again. Chee calls Janet Pete, who meets him in Tuba City. She had two ways to use the information Chee gave her about the FBI's refusal to test the first eagle, and she chose the one that was least risk to her, and most likely to hurt Chee professionally. Their love is not strong enough to overcome their differences, and the pain of losing her will hurt tremendously.

Characters
Joe Leaphorn: Lieutenant from the Navajo Tribal Police for the last year, widowed. He lives in Window Rock.
Jim Chee: Acting Lieutenant in the Navajo Tribal Police, recently transferred to the Tuba City office.
Anderson Nez: Navajo man who dies of bubonic plague faster than doctors can believe. He is an assistant to Dr. Woody in his research on infectious diseases.
Dr. Albert Woody: Researcher in infectious diseases, including bubonic plague. He is single-minded in his work. He risks spread of the disease and murders two who get in his way.
Shirley Akheah: Nurse at Northern Arizona Medical Center who aids in Nez's treatment and later tells Leaphorn all she heard when Dr. Woody was at the hospital to bring Nez there and to seek data when Nez died.
Robert Jano: A young Hopi man from Second Mesa who caught one eagle, let it go, caught a second one when police arrived.
Benjamin Kinsman: Officer in Navajo Tribal Police seeking Hopi man on Navajo lands in pursuit of eagle feathers for religious ceremony, called for back-up, found mortally injured by Chee.
Catherine Ann Pollard: She works for the Arizona Health Department and Indian Health Service as a vector control specialist, trapping fleas and small mammals for presence of bubonic plague bacteria in Arizona. She did not return from work nor return her vehicle.
Mrs. Millicent Vanders:  Elderly aunt of Cathy Pollard who seeks help from Leaphorn in finding her.
Janet Pete: Lawyer in federal Department of Justice. She is half Navajo and grew up in the cities of the East Coast. She returns to work in the Four Corners area after being home in Washington DC. She had been engaged to Chee. She is assigned to defend Jano. She was introduced in Skinwalkers.
Mr. Peabody: Attorney in Peabody, Snell and Glick for Mrs. Vanders, who contacts Leaphorn.
J. D. Mickey: Acting Assistant US attorney, the federal prosecutor on Jano case who also wants to run for office.
Edgar Evans: FBI agent new to the area.
Louisa Bourebonette: Professor of cultural anthropology, friend of Leaphorn, who was introduced in Coyote Waits.
John Raynold: FBI agent in charge who refuses to test the first eagle for presence of Jano's blood.
Bernadette (Bernie) Manuelito: Young officer recently transferred to Tuba City office of Navajo Tribal Police, introduced in The Fallen Man.
Richard Krause: Boss of Cathy Pollard, and a biologist.
Victor Hammer: Graduate student at Arizona State University in Tempe from Germany studying vertebrate biology with interest in the spread of and survival from bubonic plague and Hanta virus. He is friends with Cathy Pollard and has run up against Dr. Woody in the field.
Albert "Cowboy" Dashee: Hopi man, friend of Chee, and Deputy Sheriff in Coconino County. He was introduced in The Dark Wind.
John “Shorty” McGinnis: He runs Short Mountain Trading Post, long time contact for Leaphorn about local skinwalker gossip, introduced in Listening Woman.
Hosteen Frank Sam Nakai: Hatalii and grand uncle to Chee, who is dying from lung cancer. He was also in Sacred Clowns.
Old Lady Notah: Grazes her goats at Yells Back Butte, was nearby on the day of the murders. She tells McGinnis that she saw a skinwalker.
Jay Kennedy: FBI agent about to retire, who calls Leaphorn for information on an old case the night before the current case is solved, and tells him the story of the Bureau's refusal to accept evidence and Chee's taped phone call. He was introduced in Skinwalkers.

Reviews

Kirkus Reviews says this novel reminds readers that Hillerman's mysteries are in a class of their own.

The day that Acting Lt. Jim Chee, of the Navajo Tribal Police, is called to Yells Back Butte by Officer Benny Kinsman, only to find Hopi eagle poacher Robert Jano standing over Kinsman’s bleeding body, is the same day that Catherine Pollard, a vector analyst from the Arizona Health Department, vanishes from Yells Back (along with her Jeep) while she’s looking for fleas—particularly the fleas that may have carried the antibiotic-resistant plague germs that killed Anderson Nez. So even though ex-Lt. Joe Leaphorn has retired from the Tribal Police (The Fallen Man, 1996), he’s back on the job, looking for Pollard at the request of her wealthy aunt. The murder case couldn’t seem simpler; Jano’s even gotten his blood obligingly mixed with his victim’s on both their clothing, and his claim that they were both nipped by an eagle isn’t borne out by the eagle on the scene, which doesn’t show a trace of blood itself. But Jano’s public defender—who just happens to be Chee’s off-again fiance Janet Pete, returned from hobnobbing in Washington, D.C., to the Rez, but not to Chee’s arms—insists that her client is innocent; Leaphorn’s crisscrossing investigation keeps turning up evidence that the murder and the disappearance are two sides of the same coin; and an ambitious prosecutor is so eager for a capital conviction that there’s got to be something funny. Chee brings it all, including his relationship with Janet, to a climax with a theatrical coup that would put a lesser writer on the map all by itself—and that reminds you, in case you’ve forgotten, that Hillerman’s mysteries are in a class of their own.

Publishers Weekly notes that Hillerman's trademark melding of Navajo tradition and modern culture is captured with crystal clarity:

The modern resurgence of the black death animates Hillerman's 14th tale featuring retired widower Navajo Tribal Police Lieutenant Joe Leaphorn and Acting Lieutenant Jim Chee. Bubonic plague has survived for centuries in the prairie-dog villages of the Southwest, where its continuing adaptation to modern antibiotics has increased its potential for mass destruction. Leaphorn is hired by a wealthy Santa Fe woman to search for her granddaughter, biologist Catherine Pollard, who has disappeared during her field work as a "flea catcher," collecting plague-carrying specimens from desert rodents. At the same time, Jim Chee arrests Robert Jano, a young Hopi man and known poacher of eagles, in the bludgeoning death of another Navajo Police officer at a site where the biologist was seen working. As Leaphorn learns more about Pollard's work from her boss in the Indian Health Service and an epidemiologist with ties to a pharmaceutical company, the U.S. Attorney's office decides to seek the death penalty against Jano, who is being represented by Chee's former fiancee, Janet Pete, recently returned from Washington, D.C. Hillerman's trademark melding of Navajo tradition and modern culture is captured with crystal clarity in this tale of an ancient scourge's resurgence in today's world. The uneasy mix of old ways and new is articulated with resonant depth as Chee, an aspiring shaman, is driven to choose between his career and his commitment to the ways of his people, and Leaphorn moves into a deeper friendship with ethnology professor, Louisa Bourebonette.

Marilyn Stasio suggests surrendering to Hillerman's strong narrative voice and supple storytelling techniques:

Tony Hillerman is a wonderful storyteller, which means that you believe every word he says. In The First Eagle (HarperCollins, $25), which like his previous police procedurals is set on the Big Reservation, straddling the Arizona-New Mexico border, a Navajo woman by the name of Old Lady Notah claims to have sighted a skinwalker -- a witch. In such a place, on such authority, it's easy to believe in skinwalkers. But as Joe Leaphorn, now retired as a tribal policeman, says, Witches offer an easy explanation for unexplained illnesses. So it's just as logical to suspect, as do some biologists working for the Indian Health Service, that a new and extraordinarily virulent strain of bubonic plague is abroad.

When one of the scientists disappears from Yells Back Butte, where a Navajo Tribal Police officer was killed, will Leaphorn and his young colleague Jim Chee put their faith in skinwalkers, medieval plague -- or something more human and more sinister? People's conflicting beliefs are never easily resolved, as Acting Lieutenant Chee, a traditional Navajo who is studying to be a shaman, learns to his sorrow once again. We readers are luckier. Surrendering to Hillerman's strong narrative voice and supple storytelling techniques, we come to see that ancient cultures and modern sciences are simply different mythologies for the same reality.

Ed Gorman finds that Hillerman has a poet's way with the land.

The great ones don't just give us stories and characters and plots and locales. The great ones give us worlds, fully imagined, fully detailed. Nero Wolfe's brownstone. Agatha Christie's English village. Raymond Chandler's Southern California. And now, Tony Hillerman's world of Navajo culture. . . . Hillerman has a poet's way with the land. He rightly understands that his entire drama is being played out against a ragged and rugged land that is as much a participant in the drama as Chee and Leaphorn themselves. Without getting corny or patronizing, he's able to convey the Navajo reverence for the land and to differentiate how the white man and the Native American view the planet. He is also wise enough not to depict all white people as know-nothing boobs. Boobism is, alas, something shared by all cultures. There's plenty to go around. Hillerman stage-manages all the various plot points — the brain-dead cop, the missing woman, the possible plague, the violent eagle — skillfully and subtly. None of the seams show. And he does it all with a lively, easygoing style that never calls attention to itself, never jars the reader out of the world he's creating before our eyes. There's a simple reason for Tony Hillerman's popularity. He's one of the best mystery writers who ever lived.

Theme

The plot revolves around death and saving people from death. Jano faces a death penalty once Chee arrests him for killing his officer, rather than simply capturing a protected species of eagle. Chee retreats from his firm stance on Janos's guilt, finds new evidence and the confessed killer, and Jano is saved from death under the law. Dr. Woody researches how certain small mammals resist the bubonic plague, thus becoming reservoirs of the infection, keeping the disease among humans. He wants to save humanity from this disease. He finds a form that is more virulent than past strains that may lead to a vaccine instead of reliance on antibiotic medications. He murders people he perceives as blocking his research, and in turn is killed by the bacteria he is researching.

Allusions to real events and places

The story takes place primarily on the Navajo Reservation in Arizona. Tuba City, Window Rock, Arizona, Phoenix, and Flagstaff are real places there. Chee resides in Shiprock, New Mexico, part of the Reservation. The specific location of the murders is called Yells Back Butte near Black Mesa.

Part of the plot revolves around the bubonic plague, a disease with a terrible history in Europe in the Middle Ages when it was called the Black Death and worldwide in the 19th century. The disease is still present in Arizona, Utah, Colorado, New Mexico and California in the United States.

Jano was found on lands that had been shared by Hopi and Navajo peoples, but a federal law had placed the area within the borders of the Navajo Nation. These are the Joint Use lands with both Navajo and Hopi making use of the land. This is a long-standing dispute. The 1974 public law and following court cases assigning one large area for the Hopi, requiring thousands of Navajos to move, did not resolve the issue. Although the situation was in some sense settled by a 1996 law, the issues continue to this day. The Hopi have lived in this large area for thousands of years, arriving before the Navajo. Further, the people of each tribe have different patterns of settlement (Navajo are dispersed over larger amount of land, originally from their occupation as sheepherders, while the Hopi are generally settled in villages, raise corn, make art and jewelry). Thus it is logical that a young Hopi man would seek a golden eagle there, though not strictly legal.

Geography
In his 2011 book Tony Hillerman's Navajoland: Hideouts, Haunts, and Havens in the Joe Leaphorn and Jim Chee Mysteries, author  has listed the following 47 geographical locations, real and fictional, mentioned in The First Eagle. 

Albuquerque, New Mexico
Aztec, New Mexico
Bekihatso Wash, Arizona
Black Mesa (Apache-Navajo Counties, Arizona)
Blue Moon Bench, Arizona
Burnt Water, Arizona
Cameron, Arizona
Cameron Trading Post, Arizona
Cedar Ridge Trading Post, Arizona
Chaol Canyon, Arizona
Checkerboard Reservation, New Mexico
Chuska Mountains, New Mexico & Arizona
Coppermine, Arizona
Coppermine Mesa, Arizona
Coppermine Trading Post, Arizona
Dinnebito Wash, Arizona
Farmington, New Mexico
Flagstaff, Arizona
Gallup, New Mexico
Garces Mesa, Arizona
Hopi Reservation, Arizona
Inscription House Trading Post, Arizona
Kaibito, Arizona
Kaibito Creek, Arizona
Kayenta, Arizona
Mishongnovi, Arizona
Moenkopi, Arizona
Moenkopi Plateau, Arizona
Navajo Mission, Arizona
Navajo Mountain, Utah & Arizona
Nazhoni Trading Post, New Mexico
Page, Arizona
Rainbow Plateau, Arizona & Utah
Red Lake Trading Post, Arizona
Rol Hai Rock, New Mexico
Santa Fe, New Mexico
Second Mesa, Arizona
Shiprock, New Mexico
Shonto, Arizona
Short Mountain Trading Post (fictitious location)
Sleeping Ute Mountain, Colorado
Table Mesa, New Mexico
Teec Nos Pos, Arizona
Tuba City, Arizona
Window Rock, Arizona
Winslow, Arizona
Yells Back Butte (fictitious location)

References

Bibliography

External links
No mystery to Tony Hillerman's success as a best-selling author Interview with Hillerman about the book by Bob Hoover, Post-Gazette Book Editor, October 31, 1998
The First Eagle in the Tony Hillerman Portal at UNM Library

1998 American novels
Novels by Tony Hillerman
HarperCollins books
Novels set in Arizona